Tuzdybastau is a village in the Talgar District of the Almaty Region of Kazakhstan. It is located about 14 km west of the town of Talgar.

Population 
In 1999, the population of the village was 9,182 people. According to the 2009 census, 12,577 people lived in the village.

References 

Populated places in Almaty Region